Gypsochares is a genus of moths in the family Pterophoridae.

Species
Gypsochares astragalotes Meyrick, 1909
Gypsochares aulotes Meyrick, 1911
Gypsochares baptodactylus (Zeller, 1850)
Gypsochares bigoti Gibeaux & J. Nel, 1989
Gypsochares catharotes (Meyrick, 1908)
Gypsochares kukti Arenberger, 1989
Gypsochares kyraensis (Ustjuzhanin, 1996)
Gypsochares londti Ustjuzhanin et Kovtunovich, 2010
Gypsochares nielswolffi Gielis & Arenberger, 1992

References 

Oidaematophorini